Flint glass is a form of glass characterised by having a high refractive index and a low Abbe number.

Flint Glass may also refer to:

 Flint Glass, an electronic music project by Gwenn Tremorin